The Madagascar nightjar or Madagascan nightjar (Caprimulgus madagascariensis) is a species of nightjar in the family Caprimulgidae.
It is native to Madagascar, Nosy Boraha and Aldabra.
Its natural habitats are subtropical or tropical moist lowland forest and subtropical or tropical moist montane forest.

References

Madagascar nightjar
Birds of Madagascar
Birds of Seychelles
Madagascar nightjar
Taxonomy articles created by Polbot